In English ecclesiastical law, contentious jurisdiction (Latin: forum contentiosum) is jurisdiction over matters in controversy between parties, in contradistinction to voluntary jurisdiction, or that exercised upon matters not opposed or controverted.

The Lords Chief Justices, judges, etc., had a contentious jurisdiction; but, the Lords of the Treasury, the Commissioners of Customs, etc., have none, being merely judges of the accounts.

References
Webster's Revised Unabridged Dictionary (1913)

Canon law of the Anglican Communion
Jurisdiction
English legal terminology